Campo Acosta is a small town in Tomatlán, Jalisco, Mexico. It has a population of 2,638. 0.83% of the inhabitants are Indigenous.

References

Populated places in Jalisco